The Finnish Basketball Cup (Finnish: Koripallon Suomen Cup) is the highest level national domestic basketball cup competition of Finland. It is the second most important basketball competition in the country, after the top-tier level Finnish national domestic league, the Korisliiga. From 2014 to 2018, the competition was not contested.

Finals

Performance by club

See also
Korisliiga

Notes

References

Basketball competitions in Finland
Basketball cup competitions in Europe